Peter Marcus "Mark" Adlard (born 19 June 1932 in Seaton Carew) is an English novelist.

The son of Arthur Marcus Adlard, an auctioneer, and Ethel (née Leech), Adlard was educated at the University of London (BSc), Trinity College, Cambridge (M.A. 1954) and the Department of Education at Oxford. Aside from writing, his career has consisted mainly of management jobs in the steel industry.

Adlard's best-known works are the social science fiction novels Interface, Volteface, and MultiFace. published during the early 1970s. The novels concern T-city, a 22nd-century domed megacity covering the entirety of the English North Eastern industrial area between the River Tyne and the River Tees.

A later novel, The Greenlander (1978) concerns the whaling industry in Northeast England during the early years of steam-powered shipping. This was intended to be the first of a series but, to date, no further volumes have been published.

References

External links
 
 entry from Science Fiction Encyclopedia

1932 births
English historical novelists
Living people
People from Seaton Carew
English science fiction writers
Alumni of the University of London
Alumni of Trinity College, Cambridge